Ali Jumaa (Arabic:علي جمعة; born 1 January 1982) is a Qatari footballer.

References

Qatari footballers
1982 births
Living people
Qatar SC players
Al Ahli SC (Doha) players
Al-Khor SC players
Al-Gharafa SC players
Qatar Stars League players
Association football fullbacks